Airdrieonians Football Club is a Scottish professional football team in Airdrie, North Lanarkshire, who are members of the Scottish Professional Football League (SPFL) and play in Scottish League One. They were formed in 2002 as Airdrie United Football Club following the liquidation of the original Airdrieonians club, formed in 1878.  The club's official name was changed in 2013 with the approval of the Scottish Football Association to the traditional name of Airdrieonians. As with the previous club, this is often colloquially shortened to simply "Airdrie".

The club have won two trophies in their short history – the Scottish Second Division in 2003–04 and the Challenge Cup in 2008–09. Once described as "the luckiest team in the Scottish League", the club have benefited in league division placements due to other club's misfortunes on three occasions (2008, 2009 and 2012).

History

Formation as Airdrie United

The club was formed in 2002 as Airdrie United, following the bankruptcy of the original Airdrieonians.

Airdrieonians had finished runners-up in the Scottish First Division in the 2001–02 season but went out of business with debts approaching £3 million. The collapse of "The Diamonds", as they were known due to their distinctive kits, created a vacancy in the Scottish Football League (in the Scottish Third Division). Accountant and Airdrieonians fan Jim Ballantyne attempted, with the help of others, to gain entry with a club called "Airdrie United" who were essentially to be a reincarnation of Airdrieonians. Their application however was rejected as the then English Northern Premier League side Gretna were preferred by league members over the new Airdrie United.

Airdrie United then went on to complete a buy-out of the ailing Second Division side Clydebank and with SFL approval the club was relocated to Airdrie, the strips were transformed to resemble that of Airdrieonians, and the name was changed to Airdrie United. While this means that the club is therefore officially a legal continuation of Clydebank, it is almost universally accepted as a reincarnation of Airdrieonians, with a new version of Clydebank being reformed by supporters' groups and entering into the West Region Junior League.

Early years – league title & new manager (2002–2006)
Managed by Sandy Stewart, Airdrie United's first match took place at New Broomfield against Forfar Athletic in August 2002, with captain Stephen Docherty scoring the only goal of the game with Airdrie United winning 1–0. Their debut season saw the club only narrowly fail to achieve promotion by one point due to a late injury-time goal from Brechin City which saw them promoted instead. The club reached the second round of the Challenge Cup, the third round of the Scottish Cup and the third round of the Scottish League Cup having beaten Premier League side Kilmarnock in the second round.

During the rest of Stewart's tenure the club reached the final of the Challenge Cup in 2003 (losing 2–0 to Inverness Caledonian Thistle), and won the Second Division title in 2003–04 season. Having started poorly Airdrie went on a run that saw them unbeaten in the last 18 games of that season, including the final game of the league campaign which saw a crowd of over 5,700 at New Broomfield to watch Airdrie defeat Morton 2–0 and lift the League Championship trophy, the club having been confirmed champions the previous week following their 1–0 victory away to Alloa Athletic at Recreation Park.

In November 2006, Stewart was sacked and replaced by former Airdrieonians player and Airdrie United coach Kenny Black, his first management post.

Mixed fortunes – play-offs, cup win & club changes (2006–2013)
Under Kenny Black the club suffered four successive play-off defeats:

 In the 2006–07 season as relegation play-off finalists (losing 5–4 on aggregate to Stirling Albion).
 In the 2007–08 season as promotion play-off finalists (losing 3–0 on aggregate to Clyde). However the enforced relegation of Gretna to the Third Division, after being put into administration, prompted a restructuring of the leagues, and Airdrie were promoted to the First Division as the losing play-off finalists.
 In the 2008–09 season as relegation play-off finalists (losing 3–2 on aggregate to Second Division runners up Ayr United). Again Airdrie were given a reprieve as the continued uncertainty over the future of Livingston meant that the West Lothian club were relegated to the Third division, so Airdrie were reinstated to the First Division as losing play-off finalists.
 In the 2009–10 season as relegation play-off semi-finalists (losing 3–1 on aggregate to Brechin City). Unlike the previous two seasons there was no reprieve.

The club won the Challenge Cup in 2008, defeating Ross County 3–2 on penalties after a 2–2 draw, and after this success manager Kenny Black signed a long-term contract (until 2012). A club decision to focus on developing youth was vindicated in January 2011, as Celtic signed teenager Tony Watt for a sum of £80,000 plus add-ons.

The first league game between Airdrie United and local rivals Albion Rovers took place at New Broomfield on 10 September 2011, with Airdrie winning 4–0. After another play-off defeat by 6–2 on aggregate to Dumbarton in the promotion play-off final at the end of 2011–12 season Airdrie were lucky again as the liquidation of the company that operated Scottish Premier League side Rangers and the decision by Scottish Football League clubs that Rangers should play in the Scottish Third Division, meant that an additional team from each tier of Scottish football was promoted for the 2012–13 season. As Airdrie were runners up in the previous season's Second Division promotion play-offs, they were promoted to the Scottish First Division. A season in the First Division came to an end in May 2013, with the club finishing bottom of the league and relegated to Division Two.

Airdrieonians name returns (2013–2015)
In June 2013, the club officially changed its name from Airdrie United Football Club to Airdrieonians Football Club. The name change revived the name of the club it was formed to replace in 2002, following the liquidation of the original Airdrieonians. The Airdrieonians all red club crest was also revived, with an alternate black and red version used for the away kits.

New ownership at the club (2015–2018)

In June 2015 Jim Ballantyne sold control of the club to Tom Wotherspoon, a Lanarkshire businessman and owner of M & H Logistics (who had previously sponsored Hamilton Academical, East Fife and BSC Glasgow). Wotherspoon became chairman and Ballantyne vice-chairman, appointing former Scottish Sun newspaper Head of Sport Iain King as Chief Executive (King left the club in June 2016).

In December 2016 the Airdrieonians Supporters Trust became the first fans group in the world to sponsor their team's home kit, with the strip paying tribute to Airdrie fan Mark Allison.

Despite retaining his majority shareholding Tom Wotherspoon resigned as chairman and director of Airdrieonians on 5 June 2017, with former chairman Jim Ballantyne taking Wotherspoon's place as chairman.

Takeover, COVID-19 & play-off disappointments (2018–2022)
In January 2018, it was announced that a consortium of various businessmen (including former Airdrieonians manager Bobby Watson) had taken control of Tom Wotherspoon's controlling shares, bringing to an end a tumultuous period for the club. The majority of the previous board was replaced, including Jim Ballantyne, and subsequently Director of Football Gordon Dalziel (appointed Oct 2016) departed. With Excelsior Stadium representation on the new board the club also indicated that they would be abandoning Ravenscraig Sports Complex in Motherwell and returning to training at the stadium.

Manager Ian Murray led the club to 5th, 3rd and two 2nd place Scottish League One finishes in 2019, 2020, 2021 and 2022 respectively, with the club missing out on play-off games (due to the COVID-19 pandemic) in 2020, losing to Championship side Morton over a 2 legged play-off final in May 2021, and losing to Scottish League One side Queen's Park over a 2 legged play-off final in May 2022. After this defeat Murray departed the club for Raith Rovers in the Scottish Championship.

Stadium

Airdrie play their home fixtures at Excelsior Stadium, also unofficially known as New Broomfield. For sponsorship reasons the venue was originally known as The Shyberry Excelsior Stadium (after Shyberry Design Ltd. who had sponsored the construction) and from 2018 to 2022 as The Penny Cars Stadium.
The ground was built when now defunct Airdrieonians' previous home, Broomfield Park, was sold to supermarket chain Safeway, who were given permission to build a new store on the site. This transaction has been cited as being the cause of the financial ruination of the club, as their old ground was demolished several years before they acquired planning permission for the new stadium. In the intervening years the club ground-shared Broadwood Stadium, in Cumbernauld, the home of Clyde.

At the end of the 2009–10 season a new 3G artificial surface was installed. This was replaced at the end of the 2021–22 season. The main pitch and adjoining small-sided facilities are all made available for local community use.

In 2003 a ground share was proposed with Falkirk as their ground did not meet SPL requirements; this was later refused as Falkirk could not prove the SPL fixtures would have priority. Queen of the South played their Uefa Cup tie in 2008 at the stadium, as did Motherwell in 2009. Queen's Park utilised the stadium for their "home" games from December 2013 until May 2014, due to the redevelopment of Hampden Park for the 2014 Commonwealth Games.

Colours and crest

Colours
Airdrie United inherited Airdrieonians' distinctive playing colours of a white shirt with a red diamond. The design was the basis of Airdrieonians' nickname, The Diamonds, which has also been adopted by Airdrie.

Crest

When Airdrie United were formed, they used a blue double-headed eagle device on a white shield for their badge, with a red scroll below the shield that read "Airdrie United F.C.", amended to bearing "Airdrie F.C." when the club rebranded in 2012. The eagle recalled the Airdrie town arms.

When the club inherited the Airdrieonians name in 2013, they also restored the badge worn by their predecessors: the original AFC bore this emblem from 1974 until their demise in 2002, excepting the 2000–01 season. This badge featured a cockerel sitting atop a shield containing two lions passant and the club's initials. The club were informed by the Lord Lyon King of Arms in March 2015 that as their badge features a shield, it constitutes a heraldic device, and heraldic devices are not permitted to carry lettering. On 19 June 2015, Airdrieonians unveiled a new crest, removing the shield and instead using a chevron–representing the "Airdrie Diamond"–to separate the scroll from the remainder of the badge.

Current squad

On loan

Club officials

Managers

 Sandy Stewart (2002–2006)
 Kenny Black (2006–2010)
 Jimmy Boyle (2010–2013)
 Gary Bollan (2013–2015)
 Eddie Wolecki Black (22 December 2015 – 31 October 2016)
 Danny Lennon (10 March 2016 – June 2016)
Lennon was appointed Acting Head Coach from March 2016 until May 2016, whilst manager Wolecki Black recovered from an illness.
 Kevin McBride (June 2016–30 October 2016)
McBride was originally appointed Acting Head Coach from June 2016 until such time as Eddie Wolecki Black was fit and able to return to work after suffering from a stroke (away to Cowdenbeath in March 2016).
 Mark Wilson (31 October 2016 – 17 June 2017)
 Willie Aitchison (4 August 2017 – 20 August 2017)
 Stevie Findlay (29 September 2017–8 October 2018)
 Ian Murray (19 October 2018 – 24 May 2022)
 Rhys McCabe (26 May 2022–)

Coaching staff
Manager: Rhys McCabe
Assistant Manager: Callum Fordyce
First Team Coach: Bryan Prunty
Goalkeeping Coach: David Hutton
Physiotherapist: JD Peacock
Logistics Manager: Gordon Thomson
Head of Academy: Alan Gow

Boardroom

Chairman: Martin Ferguson 
Directors: Sam Greene, Paul Hetherington, David McArthur, Scott Russell, Gordon Watson
Honorary President: Ian McMillan

Club honours & records

Honours
Scottish League Second Division: Winners: 2003–04 Runners up: 2007–08
Scottish Challenge Cup: Winners: 2008–09 Runners up: 2003–04
 North Lanarkshire Cup: Winners: 2022
 Meldrum Cup: Winners: 2015

Records

Official club awards

Player of the Year

Hall of Fame
A Hall of Fame was established by the new club in 2002 to honour noted players of the previous entity (some of whom also played for the new club), with more entrants added each year.

Evan Balfour
John Ballantyne
Rose Ballantyne
Jim Black
Jimmy Boyle
Drew Busby
Antonio Calderon
Sandy Clark
Sammy Conn
James Connor
Steve Cooper
Jimmy Crapnell
Jack Dalziel
Tommy Duncan
Stephen Docherty
Bobby Flavell
John Flood
Tom Forsyth
Hughie Gallacher

Sam Goodwin
Stevie Gray
Paul Jack
Drew Jarvie
Paul Jonquin
Jackie Keenan
Walter Kidd
John Lapsley
Alan Lawrence
Lawrie Leslie
Paul Lovering
Alex MacDonald
Roddy McKenzie
Jim March
John Martin
Kevin McCann
Willie McCulloch
Brian McKeown
Stephen McKeown

Ian McMillan
Brian McPhee
Tommy Murray
Frank O'Rourke
Bobby Ramsey
Jimmy Reid
John Reid
Jim Rodger
Joey Rowan
Willie Russell
Jimmy Sandison
Bob Scott
Matt Scott
Andy Smith
Sandy Stewart
Bobby Watson
Jimmy Welch
Derek Whiteford
Billy Wilson

See also
 Section B

References

External links

 

 
Football clubs in Scotland
Football in North Lanarkshire
Association football clubs established in 2002
2002 establishments in Scotland
Scottish Football League teams
Scottish Challenge Cup winners
Scottish Professional Football League teams
Phoenix clubs (association football)
Sports team relocations
Airdrie, North Lanarkshire